The Lucerne hammer is a type of polearm which was popular in Swiss armies during the 15th to 17th centuries. It was a combination of the bec de corbin and a pronged war hammer.

Origins
The weapon originates from Switzerland, and the name comes from a discovery of many of these weapons in Lucerne, Switzerland.

Design 
The hammer-part of the Lucerne hammer is a three-to-four-pronged head mounted atop a 2-meter-long (7 foot) polearm shaft. It bears a long spike on its reverse, and an even longer spike extending from the top. They are occasionally found to have spikes on the side of the head as well.

Use
The Lucerne hammer requires both hands for effective handling. As a modified polearm, Lucerne hammers have multiple functions in battle. The forward-pointing spike could be used for spearing, while the hammer proved effective at puncturing or smashing armour. Like many other polearms, the Lucerne hammer was also used for dismounting the enemy. The long pole increased the velocity of the head when the hammer was struck, resulting in tremendous force upon impact.

See also
 Swiss arms and armour

References

External links
Spotlight: The Medieval Poleaxe, by Alexi Goranov

Medieval polearms

Military history of Switzerland